Massachusetts Senate's 2nd Essex district in the United States is one of 40 legislative districts of the Massachusetts Senate. It covers portions of Essex county. Democrat Joan Lovely of Salem has represented the district since 2013.

Towns represented
The district includes the following localities:
 Beverly
 Danvers
 Peabody
 Salem
 Topsfield

The current district geographic boundary overlaps with those of the Massachusetts House of Representatives' 4th Essex, 6th Essex, 7th Essex, 12th Essex, and 13th Essex districts.

Former locales
The district previously covered the following:
 Hamilton, circa 1860s
 Middleton, circa 1860s
 South Danvers, circa 1860s
 Wenham, circa 1860s

List of senators 

 J.B.F. Osgood, circa 1859 
 Francis T. Berry, circa 1894
 E. Howard Perley
 Thomas Walter Creese
 Arthur S. Adams, circa 1911
 Albert Pierce, circa 1935 
 J. Elmer Callahan, circa 1945

Images
Portraits of legislators

See also
 List of Massachusetts Senate elections
 List of Massachusetts General Courts
 List of former districts of the Massachusetts Senate
 Other Essex County districts of the Massachusett Senate: 1st,  3rd; 1st Essex and Middlesex; 2nd Essex and Middlesex
 Essex County districts of the Massachusetts House of Representatives: 1st, 2nd, 3rd, 4th, 5th, 6th, 7th, 8th, 9th, 10th, 11th, 12th, 13th, 14th, 15th, 16th, 17th, 18th

References

External links
 Ballotpedia
  (State Senate district information based on U.S. Census Bureau's American Community Survey).
 

Senate
Government of Essex County, Massachusetts
Massachusetts Senate